Patent Ochsner is one of Switzerland's best-known rock bands, all of whose studio albums but one have topped the Swiss charts. Hailing from Bern, they perform songs in Swiss German.

Current line-up (2006) 
 Hanspeter Huber (vocals)
 Monic Mathys (bass guitar)
 Andi Hug (drums)
 Christian Brantschen (keyboard, accordion)
 Menk Grossniklaus (saxophone)
 Disu Gmünder (guitar)
 Pascal Steiner (keys and wind sven Jauch
 Daniel Woodtli (trumpet)

History 
Patent Ochsner was formed in Bern in 1990 by singer Büne Huber and four other musicians. The lineup would change several times during the years. The band got their name from a ubiquitous type of Swiss dustbin and trash containers, manufactured by J. Ochsner AG and stamped with "Patent Ochsner". 

In 1991, they released their debut "Schlachtplatte" (butcher plate; a traditional dish containing different types of meat and sausages). As the song "Bälpmoos" (about Belpmoos, Bern's regional airport) got huge radio airplay on Swiss radio stations they became quite famous in Switzerland. The ballad "Scharlachrot" (Scarlet) would increase their popularity.

In 1993 they released their second LP "Fischer" (fisherman), their first number one album. The year after "Gmües" (Vegetables) came out, completing their "food trilogy" together with Schlachtplatte and Fischer. "Gmües" contained the single hit "Jänner" (January).

In 1995 Patent Ochsner released the Song "Jacques" as their contribution to the campaign against French nuclear tests at Mururoa.
The next year they released the hit single "W. Nuss vo Bümpliz" (a pun on Venus), followed by the album "Stella Nera" in 1997.
After the live album "Wildbolz & Süsstrunk" released the year after, they had a break of a few years. Büne Huber released a solo album during this time.

Patent Ochsner had their comeback with 2 hit singles "Brandstifter" (arsonist) and "Trybguet" (flotsam), this song giving the name for their next album, released in 2003. In 2005 they released another album "Liebi, Tod & Tüüfu" (love, death & devil).

Discography

Studio albums
 Schlachtplatte - (1991) - Zytglogge Verlag
 Fischer -  (February, 1993) - COD Records
 Gmües -  (August 29, 1994) - BMG Ariola (Switzerland)
 Stella Nera -  (January 27, 1997) - BMG Ariola (Switzerland)
 Trybguet -  (May 5, 2003) - BMG Ariola (Switzerland)
 Liebi, Tod + Tüüfu -  (September 26, 2005) - Muve Records
 The Rimini Flashdown - (August 29, 2008) - Universal
 Johnny - The Rimini Flashdown Part II - (July 26, 2012) - Universal
 Finitolavoro - The Rimini Flashdown Part III - (2015) – Universal
 Cut Up (May 26, 2019) – Universal

Live albums 
 Wildbolz & Süsstrunk - (September 21, 1998) - BMG Ariola (Switzerland)
 Bundesplatz (CD + DVD) - (November 5, 2010) - Universal
 Gurten 2015 Live (November 6, 2015) - Universal
 Strange Fruits – Unique Moments – Live im Landesmuseum (November 3, 2017) - Universal

Radio singles 
 Vohinger + Vovor (2005)
 Grüens Liecht (2005)

Books 
 Büne Huber, Martin Albisetti: Patent Ochsner Songbook. Stellanera, Bern 2004

References

External links
patentochsner.ch
Discography on hitparade.ch
Patent Ochsner Fansite

Swiss rock music groups